Anolis nasofrontalis, the nose anole, is a species of lizard in the family Dactyloidae. The species is found in Brazil.

References

Anoles
Reptiles described in 1933
Endemic fauna of Brazil
Reptiles of Brazil
Taxa named by Afrânio Pompílio Gastos do Amaral